Leah Song (born Leah Smith) is an American singer-songwriter, multi-instrumental musician, storyteller, poet, artist, and activist known for her role as one of the two frontsisters of Rising Appalachia — with younger sister Chloe Smith — incorporating sultry vocals, rhythm, banjo, guitar, ballads, dance, spoken-word and storytelling into her work. Her music is based in the traditions of Southern soul and international roots music.

Song engages in social activism and is involved with environment, food justice, human rights and prison reform. She has been a speaker at TEDx in Asheville, North Carolina.

Early life and education
Leah Smith was born and grew up in Atlanta, Georgia into an artistic family. Her father, Andrew Hunter Smith, is a folk-sculptor and painter. Her mother, Jan Smith, is a jazz pianist and folk musician schooled in the traditions of southern Appalachian folk music who played fiddle with the Rosin Sisters.

Her musical education was nurtured by her mother, who ensured that both sisters received classical and jazz piano training for most of their upbringing. Smith's mother also guided their training in vocals and harmony singing. Banjo, fiddle and guitar came later, after the sisters had left home and moved to Asheville, North Carolina.

She graduated from Henry W. Grady High School where she was involved in political activism.

Travels
Determined to pursue an experiential form of education, at 19 Song moved to Mexico, where she became involved with the Zapatista movement. In a 2014 interview, she said of the experience,

Activism

Song is an activist who is concerned with homeless youth education as well as indigenous rights She was an activist before she became a musician. In a 2019 interview, Song said,

Asked about indigenous rights and cultural appropriation, in the same interview Song said,

Song is also involved in the environmental activism of the Appalachian Mountains and Gulf Coast regions. She is also involved with food justice, human rights activism, and prison activism. She works with prison programs which cultivate emotional release through the arts around the United States.

Rising Appalachia has sung in support of the Occupy movement.

Musical career

Song and her sister Chloe decided to record their first album, Leah and Chloe (2006), one afternoon in the basement studio of a friend in downtown Atlanta, Georgia. The album was meant as a gift for family and friends but they received so much support and recognition for it that they decided to officially start a band called Rising Appalachia.

In the early days, the sisters busked in the French Quarter of New Orleans and elsewhere. They began to find their own natural interpretation of Appalachian music which brought together folk, soul, hip-hop, classical, southern gospel and other styles based on their upbringing on traditional Appalachian string band music, as well as on their exposure to urban music like hip-hop and jazz and the influence of roots music of all kinds which they experienced during their worldwide travels.

Song's spoken-word poetry is a driving influence behind Rising Appalachia's music. Her background in movement arts has inspired her to cultivate a relationship with the global circus arts and street theater communities.

Slow Music Movement and the Wider Circles Rail Tour 
Song coined the term "Slow Music Movement" while preparing for a TedX talk. During Rising Appalachia's Wider Circles Rail Tour, the band travelled by Amtrak train. Song connected this with the "Slow Music Movement", which she described as exploring the question as to how music can be a public service,  saying:

Selected discography

With Rising Appalachia

 
 
 
 
 
 
  (live album)

Independent music videos

Collaborative music videos

Interviews and talks

See also
Environmental issues in Appalachia
Environmental justice and coal mining in Appalachia
Social and economic stratification in Appalachia
Rosemary Gladstar
Songlines

References

Citations

Works cited

Further reading

External links

Year of birth missing (living people)
Living people
21st-century American women singers
21st-century American singers
American activists
American banjoists
American folk singers
American multi-instrumentalists
American spoken word artists
American storytellers
American women guitarists
American women poets
American women singer-songwriters
Bodhrán players
Feminist musicians
Folk musicians from Georgia (U.S. state)
Guitarists from Georgia (U.S. state)
Musicians from Appalachia
Musicians from Atlanta
Musicians from New Orleans
Rising Appalachia
Singer-songwriters from Georgia (U.S. state)
Women storytellers